Policarpo Cacherano d'Osasco (1744 in Cantarana – 27 August 1824, in Turin) was an officer during the Napoleonic Wars, who rose to the rank of general.

Notes

References

1744 births
1824 deaths
Italian commanders of the Napoleonic Wars
Generals of former Italian states